The 2012–13 Bangladesh Women's Football League, also known as the Walton Dhaka Metropolis Women's Football League 2013 due to sponsorship reason, it was the 2nd season of domestic women's club football competition in Bangladesh organized by Bangladesh Football Federation (BFF). The 8 teams were participated in the tournament.

Dhaka Abahani Women are current champions. The club have defeated Dhaka Mohammedan Women by 3–1 on 5 March  2013 to lift the trophy for the first time.

Venue

Participating teams
The following eight teams will contest in the tournament.

Group summary

Round and dates

Group stages

Tiebreakers
Teams were ranked according to points (3 points for a win, 1 point for a draw, 0 points for a loss), and if tied on points, the following tie-breaking criteria were applied, in the order given, to determine the rankings.
Points in head-to-head matches among tied teams;
Goal difference in head-to-head matches among tied teams;
Goals scored in head-to-head matches among tied teams;
If more than two teams are tied, and after applying all head-to-head criteria above, a subset of teams are still tied, all head-to-head criteria above are reapplied exclusively to this subset of teams;
Goal difference in all group matches;
Goals scored in all group matches;
Penalty shoot-out if only two teams were tied and they met in the last round of the group;
Disciplinary points (yellow card = 1 point, red card as a result of two yellow cards = 3 points, direct red card = 3 points, yellow card followed by direct red card = 4 points);
Drawing of lots.

Group A

Group B

Knockout stage
In the knockout stages, if a match finished goalless at the end of normal playing time, extra time would have been played (two periods of 15 minutes each) and followed, if necessary, by a penalty shoot-out to determine the winner.

Bracket

Winners

Statistics

Goalscorers

References

Bangladesh Women's Football League seasons
Women's football in Bangladesh
2013 in Bangladeshi football
2012–13 in Asian association football leagues
2012–13 domestic women's association football leagues